Anna Maria Zielińska-Głębocka (born 29 September 1949) is a Polish politician. She was elected to the Sejm on 25 September 2005, getting 3797 votes in 25 Gdańsk district as a candidate from the Civic Platform list.

See also
Members of Polish Sejm 2005-2007

External links
Anna Zielińska-Głębocka - parliamentary page - includes declarations of interest, voting record, and transcripts of speeches.

Members of the Polish Sejm 2005–2007
Women members of the Sejm of the Republic of Poland
Civic Platform politicians
1949 births
Living people
21st-century Polish women politicians
Members of the Polish Sejm 2007–2011